This is the results breakdown of the local elections held in the Region of Murcia on 26 May 1991. The following tables show detailed results in the autonomous community's most populous municipalities, sorted alphabetically.

City control
The following table lists party control in the most populous municipalities, including provincial capitals (shown in bold). Gains for a party are displayed with the cell's background shaded in that party's colour.

Municipalities

Cartagena
Population: 175,966

Lorca
Population: 67,338

Murcia
Population: 322,911

See also
1991 Murcian regional election

References

Murcia
1991